Don't Say a Word is Sonata Arctica's fourth EP released on 30 August 2004 through the label Nuclear Blast. 

Don't Say a Word was covered by German symphonic metal band Xandria in their 2015 EP Fire & Ashes.

Track listing

Personnel
Tony Kakko – vocals, keyboards
Jani Liimatainen – guitars
Marko Paasikoski – bass
Henrik Klingenberg – keyboards, Hammond organ
Tommy Portimo – drums

References

Sonata Arctica albums
Nuclear Blast EPs
2004 EPs